Smoky Mountain News is a free weekly newspaper based in Waynesville, North Carolina that is distributed in Haywood, Jackson, Macon and  Swain counties, North Carolina.

References

Weekly newspapers published in North Carolina
Haywood County, North Carolina